The Soft Bulletin is the ninth studio album by American rock band the Flaming Lips, released by Warner Bros. Records on May 17, 1999, in the United Kingdom, and on June 22, 1999, in the United States. The album was released to widespread acclaim, and was hailed by critics as a departure from their previous guitar-heavy alternative rock sound into a more layered, intricately arranged work.

Music and lyrics
The album was considered to mark a change in the course for the band, with more traditional catchy melodies, accessible-sounding music (their previous album Zaireeka was a quadruple album of experimental sounds meant to be played on four separate stereo systems simultaneously), and more serious and thoughtful lyrics.

The album was also noted for its fusion of ordinary rock instruments, electronic beats, and synthesizers. Its large, layered, symphonic sound has also earned it a reputation as the Pet Sounds of the 1990s from a few critics. This sound was achieved in part by detuning and layering multiple MIDI keyboards as opposed to recording a live orchestra.

Artwork
The cover artwork of the album is a modified version of a photograph taken by Lawrence Schiller titled The Acid Test: Neal Cassady, which according to Schiller, depicts Neal Cassady dancing with his own shadow during an Acid Test conducted by the Merry Pranksters. The original photograph was featured in a 1966 Life magazine article on LSD.

Reception

The Soft Bulletin was lauded by critics and fans alike and topped numerous "Best of 1999" lists. The album is now considered by many to be the Flaming Lips's masterpiece. The Soft Bulletin is considered by some to be partially responsible for establishing the latter-day identity of the Flaming Lips, and as its following expanded over the years after its release, paving the way to their being among the most well-respected groups of the 2000s.

In 2006, Robert Dimery chose The Soft Bulletin and its follow-up Yoshimi Battles the Pink Robots as part of his book 1001 Albums You Must Hear Before You Die. Pitchfork ranked the album 3rd on the Top 100 albums of the 1990s list, and awarded it a rare score of 10.0. AllMusic's Jason Ankeny gave it a highly enthusiastic review, concluding that "there's no telling where The Lips will go from here, but it's almost beside the point -- not just the best album of 1999, The Soft Bulletin might be the best record of the entire decade". According to Acclaimed Music, The Soft Bulletin is the most acclaimed album of 1999, as well as the 110th most acclaimed all time.

Since late 2010, the album has been sporadically performed live in its entirety over the years, and on May 26, 2016, an orchestra was used to embellish sounds of the album while the band played their main instruments for the album at the concert.

As of 2002 it had sold 100,000 units in the United States according to Nielsen SoundScan.

Track listing
Upon its release, The Soft Bulletin was subject to record company demands for commercial-sounding music, hence the inclusion of remixes of several songs. In addition, the US ("The Spiderbite Song") and UK ("Slow Motion") CDs each contain one track that the other does not.

US CD release

The worldwide digital edition uses the US track listing but switches the versions of "Race for the Prize" (track 1 and 13).

UK and Australian CD release

Vinyl release

The Soft Bulletin 5.1
On January 31, 2006, Warner Bros. re-released The Soft Bulletin in the US as a two-disc package titled The Soft Bulletin 5.1. It includes a remastered CD and a DVD-Audio disc that contains a 5.1-channel surround sound mix of the album.

Package content

CD and DVD
 "Race for the Prize" – 4:18
 "A Spoonful Weighs a Ton" – 3:32
 "The Spark That Bled" – 5:55
 "Slow Motion" – 3:49
 "What Is the Light?" – 4:05
 "The Observer" – 4:11
 "Waitin' for a Superman" – 4:17
 "Suddenly Everything Has Changed" – 3:54
 "The Gash" – 4:02
 "Feeling Yourself Disintegrate" – 5:23
 "Sleeping on the Roof" – 3:04
 "The Spiderbite Song" – 4:02
 "Buggin'" – 3:22

DVD videos
 "Race for the Prize" – 4:26
 "Waitin' for a Superman" – 4:39

DVD outtakes
 "1000 Ft. Hands" – 5:50
 "The Captain Is a Cold Hearted and Egotistical Fool" – 5:14
 "Satellite of You" – 4:32

DVD radio sessions
 "Up Above the Daily Hum" – 4:38
 "The Switch That Turns Off the Universe" – 7:54
 "We Can't Predict the Future" – 3:04
 "It Remained Unrealizable" – 8:34

The 5.1 package has the UK track list with the remixes at the end removed. They were replaced with "The Spiderbite Song" and the original mix of "Buggin'" which had previously only seen release on a US promotional CD.
This package marks the first time that US consumers have been able to get "Slow Motion" on CD, as this had previously only been available on the UK CD and the US vinyl releases.

Packaging error
The first pressings of The Soft Bulletin 5.1 were erroneously shipped with an original US CD instead of the new remastered CD with the revised track list. The band offered to replace the incorrect CD with the new version for anyone who received the wrong CD in their package. In addition, many people who sent their incorrect CDs in for replacement also received a handwritten letter of apology from the band's bassist, Michael Ivins. Warner Bros. has since fixed this problem.

Personnel
The Flaming Lips
Wayne Coyne – vocals, guitar, keyboards, theremin
Michael Ivins – bass, keyboards, backing vocals, engineering
Steven Drozd – drums, percussion, guitar, keyboards, bass, backing vocals

Production
The Flaming Lips – production, mix, recording
Dave Fridmann – production, mix, recording
Michael Ivins – additional engineering
Scott Booker – production
Steve Hall – mastering (at Future Disc Systems)

Remixes 
Peter Mokran – additional production & mix
Scott Bennett – additional bass on "Waitin' for a Superman (Remix)"

Packaging
Lawrence Schiller – cover photograph
George Salisbury – layout & design

References

1999 albums
The Flaming Lips albums
Warner Records albums
Albums produced by Dave Fridmann
Albums recorded at Tarbox Road Studios
Art rock albums by American artists